Rut is both a surname and a feminine German given name. Notable people with the name include:

 Rut Bízková (born 1957), former Minister of Environment of the Czech Republic
 Rut Brandt (1920–2006), German writer
 Rut Bryk (1916–1999), Finnish ceramist
 Rut Berglund (1897–1984), Swedish opera singer
 Rut Carballido Lopez, Spanish-born microbiologist
 Rut Hillarp (1914–2003), Swedish poet and novelist
 Rut Holm (1900–1971), Swedish film actress
 Rut Arnfjörð Jónsdóttir (born 1990), Icelandic handballer
 Rut Rutka Laskier (1929–1943), Jewish Polish diarist and Holocaust victim
 Rut Blees Luxemburg (born 1967), German photographer
 Rut Wermuth (born 1928), Jewish German Holocaust survivor
 John Rut (fl. 1512–1528), English mariner
 Tadeusz Rut (1931–2002), Polish hammer and discus thrower

See also
 Nicolaes Ruts (1573-1638), merchant whose portrait was painted by Rembrandt

German feminine given names